Zenon Nowak (27 January 1905 – 21 August 1980) was a Communist activist and politician in the People's Republic of Poland. He was one of the members of the pro-Soviet Natolin faction of the PZPR Central Committee during the Polish October of 1956.

See also
 Stalinism in Poland
 Poznań 1956 protests

References

1905 births
1980 deaths
People from Pabianice
People from Piotrków Governorate
Communist Party of Poland politicians
Polish Workers' Party politicians
Members of the Politburo of the Polish United Workers' Party
Members of the Polish Sejm 1952–1956
Members of the Polish Sejm 1961–1965
Members of the Polish Sejm 1965–1969
Members of the Polish Sejm 1969–1972
Ambassadors of Poland to Russia

International Lenin School alumni